Lyrics Of Two is a band from Los Angeles, California, United States. The band was founded by lyricist, songwriter, and sociologist Marie Helen Abramyan, who is also a classically trained pianist. Her training began with her uncle Ashot Abramyan, a notable violinist of the Utah Symphony, after whom the Abramyan String Quartet was founded.

Lyrics Of Two have scored many chart-topping, award-winning songs, and have been recognized as "one of the most innovative and original bands from Los Angeles." Lyrics Of Two have held the #1 spot consecutively on the Deli Music Charts in the category of mainstream pop in Los Angeles  and also held the #1 spot for the entire west coast region of the Deli Music Charts for mainstream pop music

Musical style 
Lyrics Of Two's musical style has been described as being "delineated from pop and country with a slice of folk alongside Americana." The band's style blends the genres of pop, rock, and country. Lyrics Of Two's sound has been described as offering a "modern spin to an overcrowded industry with... innovative hook and a sophisticated sound in a Millennial dominated field of electronic music." The band has been said to have an approach to music that is "clean, fresh yet arranged in such a mature manner that their music can bear on to almost any demographic."

Discography 
Lyrics Of Two have released the following records:

References

External links

Musical groups from Los Angeles
Songwriters from California
American lyricists
American composers